Talebabad (also Romanized as Ţālebābād; also known as Shahīd Bāhonar) is a village in Hoseynabad Rural District, in the Central District of Shush County, Khuzestan Province, Iran. At the 2006 census, its population was 182, in 28 families.

References 

Populated places in Shush County